Bonke Innocent (born 20 January 1996) is a Nigerian professional footballer who plays for as a midfielder for Ligue 1 club Lorient and the Nigeria national team.

Club career
On 2 August 2017, Malmö FF announced the signing of Innocent on a contract until 2021 for a fee of €800,000.

Innocent was released by Malmö FF at the end of 2021, and he then signed a 3.5-year contract for Ligue 1 side FC Lorient.

International career
Innocent made his debut for the Nigeria national team on 7 September 2021 in a World Cup qualifier against Cape Verde, a 2–1 away victory. He started and played the whole match.

Career statistics

Club

Honours

Malmö FF
Allsvenskan: 2017, 2020, 2021

References

1996 births
Living people
Sportspeople from Kaduna
Nigerian footballers
Association football midfielders
Nigeria international footballers
Allsvenskan players
Eliteserien players
Ligue 1 players
Lillestrøm SK players
Malmö FF players
FC Lorient players
Nigerian expatriate footballers
Nigerian expatriate sportspeople in Norway
Expatriate footballers in Norway
Nigerian expatriate sportspeople in France
Expatriate footballers in France